The 2018 Asian Games ( or Asian Games 2018), officially known as the 18th Asian Games and also known as Jakarta-Palembang 2018 or Indonesia 2018, was a continental multi-sport event that was held from 18 August to 2 September 2018 in Jakarta and Palembang.

For the first time, the Summer Asian Games were co-hosted by two regions; the Indonesian capital of Jakarta (which was hosting the Games for the first time since 1962), and Palembang, the capital of South Sumatra province. Events were held in and around the two cities, including venues in Bandung and the provinces of West Java and Banten. The opening and closing ceremonies of the Games were held at Gelora Bung Karno Stadium in Jakarta. The Games were originally awarded to Hanoi, Vietnam, but withdrew in 2014 due to budgetary concerns and other factors.

Several non-Olympic events were trimmed from the event programme, but several new disciplines being introduced at the 2020 Summer Olympics in Tokyo (including 3-on-3 basketball) were added. Esports and canoe polo were also contested as demonstration sports.

China led the medal tally for the tenth consecutive time. North and South Korea fielded a unified team during the opening ceremony and selected events, and also won their first-ever gold medal as a unified team at a multi-sport event. 6 world, 18 Asian and 86 Asian Games records were broken during the Games, while Japanese swimmer Rikako Ikee was announced as the most valuable player.

Bidding process 

The OCA originally planned to hold these Games in 2019 rather than 2018, so that Asian Games would be held in the year immediately before the 2020 Summer Olympics instead of two years before. After they were awarded to Indonesia, the OCA backtracked on these plans and kept the Games in 2018, so that they would not interfere with the 2019 Indonesian general election.

Initial bidding 
Hanoi, Vietnam was originally selected to be the host after they won the bid against two other candidates, Surabaya and Dubai. They were awarded the winning bid on 8 November 2012, with 29 votes against Surabaya's 14 votes. Dubai pulled out at the last minute, instead announcing their intention to focus on future bids. The UAE's National Olympic Committee's vice-president denied any pullout and claimed that Dubai "did not apply for hosting 2019 Asian Games" and had "only considered" doing so.

However, in March 2014, there were some concerns about Vietnam's ability to host. These included concerns over whether the anticipated budget of US$150 million was realistic. There were claims that the government would eventually spend over US$300 million. In addition, critics were concerned that several stadiums built in conjunction with the 2003 Southeast Asian Games had not been utilized since. Former chairman of the Vietnam Olympic Committee Ha Quang Du also claimed that hosting the Asian Games would not boost tourism in Vietnam.

On 17 April 2014, Vietnamese Prime Minister Nguyễn Tấn Dũng officially announced Hanoi's withdrawal from hosting, citing unpreparedness and economic recession as the main reasons for the withdrawal, saying "they have left the country unable to afford the construction of facilities and venues". Many Vietnamese people supported the decision to withdraw. No penalty was imposed for the withdrawal.

Appointment of Jakarta and Palembang 
After Hanoi's withdrawal, the OCA said that Indonesia, China, and the United Arab Emirates were major candidates under consideration to host. Indonesia was widely regarded as a favourite, since Surabaya was the runner-up of the previous bid, and willing to do so if selected. The Philippines and India expressed their interest about hosting the Games, but India failed to submit a late bid because it was unable to get an audience with Prime Minister Narendra Modi after being given an extended deadline by the OCA.

On 5 May 2014, the OCA visited several Indonesian cities, including Jakarta, Surabaya, Bandung, and Palembang. At this time Surabaya decided to drop their bid to host the Games and instead focus on hosting the already scheduled 2021 Asian Youth Games. On 25 July 2014, during a meeting in Kuwait City, the OCA appointed Jakarta as the host of the Games with Palembang as the supporting host. Jakarta was chosen because of its well-equipped sports facilities, adequate transportation networks, and other facilities such as hotels and lodging for guests. On 20 September 2014, Indonesia signed the host city contract, and was ceremonially appointed host during the closing ceremony of the 2014 Asian Games in Incheon. An organising committee was formed soon after the appointment.

Development and preparations

Costs 
By 2015, the central government had allocated a budget of IDR 3 trillion (US$224 million) to prepare for the Games, with regional administrations also expected to supply some part of the funding. By July 2018, the budget allocation for the Games had been reported to be IDR 6.6 trillion (US$450 million) including IDR 869 billion (US$59 million) from sponsorships. However, on 2 September 2018, the Finance Minister of Indonesia Sri Mulyani disclosed that IDR 8.2 trillion was financed by 2015–2018 state budget, which was used by the local organizing committee, namely the Indonesia Asian Games Organizing Committee (INASGOC) led by Erick Thohir, for all preparations, opening, organising, and finalizing the implementation of the 2018 Asian Games. The total cost of arranging the Games is estimated about US$3.2 billion, of which $2.4 billion being spent on infrastructure development associated with the games.

Volunteers
Phase 2 volunteering programme of Jakarta-Palembang 2018 Asian Games began on 18 December 2017 with target of 13,000 volunteers being set. The volunteers wore clothing which included jacket, polo shirts and trousers which they collected from the Uniform Distribution and Accreditation Centre at the Sports and Recreation Arena in East Jakarta. Volunteers also wore accreditation card which gain them access to specific venues and buildings around the site.

Torch relay 

On 10 May 2018, 100 days before their opening, the Asian Games torch was unveiled. The design was inspired by the golok and skin — traditional weapons originating from Jakarta and Palembang.

The torch relay began at the Major Dhyan Chand National Stadium in New Delhi, host of the 1st Asian Games, on 15 July 2018. The flame was generated from a parabolic mirror directed at the sun. On 18 July 2018, a ceremony took place in Brahma field by the 9th century Hindu temple of Prambanan near Yogyakarta, where the torch's flame from India were fused together with an Indonesian natural eternal flame taken from Mrapen, Central Java. Subsequently, the Torch Relay Concert were performed marking the start of torch relay throughout the country.

The relay travelled through 54 cities in 18 provinces in Indonesia, including host cities. The relay finished on 17 August, the 73rd anniversary of the Proclamation of Indonesian Independence, at the National Monument in Jakarta before being carried into the opening ceremony at Gelora Bung Karno Stadium the next day.

Marketing

Emblem and mascot

The initial emblem for the 2018 Asian Games was first unveiled on 9 September 2015, in celebration of the country's National Sports Day. On 27 December 2015, the Games' mascot, Drawa, was unveiled by vice president Jusuf Kalla. Both the emblem and mascot were a stylized rendition of the cenderawasih, a rare species of bird in Indonesia.

The designs were widely criticised for their outdated appearance, and Drawa was also criticised for having little connection to Indonesian culture and history (with some Indonesians joking that the mascot looked more like a chicken than a cenderawasih). Organisers ultimately withdrew the original emblem and mascot, and announced an open call for a new design. Out of 60 submissions, the new emblem — entitled "Energy of Asia" — was unveiled on 28 July 2016. The new emblem was modelled upon the Gelora Bung Karno Stadium, and was intended to symbolise unity among Asian countries.

Three new mascots were also unveiled: Bhin Bhin, a greater bird-of-paradise; Atung, a Bawean deer; and Kaka, a Javan rhinoceros. They represent the Eastern, Central, and Western regions of Indonesia, as well as strategy, speed and strength. The mascots' outfits reflect traditional textiles; Bhin Bhin wears a vest with Asmat pattern details, Atung wears a sarong with batik tumpal patterns, and Kaka wears a Palembang songket with floral patterns. Their names were derived from the national motto of Indonesia, Bhinneka Tunggal Ika (Unity in Diversity).

Medals
The medal designs were unveiled in July 2018, featuring batik designs reflecting the unity and diversity of Indonesian and Asian culture.

Promotion 
On 18 August 2017, simultaneous events were held at Jakarta's National Monument and Palembang's Kuto Besak Fort to mark the one-year milestone before the Games. The event in Jakarta was attended by president Joko Widodo, and featured performances by Taeyeon and Kim Hyo-yeon of K-pop group Girls' Generation. Countdown clocks were unveiled at the Selamat Datang Monument and in front of Gelora Sriwijaya Stadium.

Several fun run events were held in Asian countries to promote the Games, beginning with Lahore, Pakistan in December 2017.

Merchandising 
The games' merchandises and licensing products which included mascot stuffed toy were sold in host city Jakarta including the Super Store in the Gelora Bung Karno sports complex from end of 2017 until end of September 2018.

Music 

The official theme song of the Games, "Meraih Bintang" ("Reach for the Stars"), was performed by Via Vallen. The song was included in a larger official album for the Games released 13 July 2018, featuring various Indonesian musicians.

As part of an effort to appeal younger spectators, the Indonesian-Japanese idol group JKT48 was signed to perform at some of the Games' venues, such as jet ski, softball, and volleyball. They performed in select events between 19 August and 1 September in a group consisted of eight members from each of its teams.

Philatelic 
As part of creating a memorable and collectible item, the Indonesian postal service Pos Indonesia issued a philatelic collectible items of the 2018 Asian Games series. These items were issued on 18 January 2018 and 18 August 2018.

Venues 

The Games used a mix of new and existing venues in Jakarta and South Sumatra (with organizers aiming to reuse existing facilities and infrastructure, such as those built for the 2011 Southeast Asian Games, to help control costs), as well as Jakarta's neighbouring provinces of Banten, and West Java. Venues were divided into four clusters, with three in Jakarta and its surrounding areas and one in Palembang.

Jakarta 

The Gelora Bung Karno Sports Complex in Jakarta hosted 13 events. The 56-year-old Main Stadium was refurbished for the Games, replacing its existing bleachers and seating with an all-seater design (reducing its capacity to 77,193), and adding new sound systems and LED lighting among other enhancements.

The Jakarta International Velodrome at Rawamangun in East Jakarta was rebuilt, at a cost of US$40 million for cycling, badminton, futsal, basketball, and wrestling. The Jakarta International Equestrian Park at Pulomas underwent a US$30.8 million renovation, with a capacity of 1,000, 100 stables, lodging for athletes, and other amenities.

Palembang 

Jakabaring Sport City was used as an event site. While there were preliminary plans to increase the size of Gelora Sriwijaya Stadium from 36,000 to 60,000 seats, they were shelved. The site still underwent some renovations, including also being converted from bleachers to an all-seater. A new 40-lane bowling alley was constructed on the complex, as well as eight additional tennis courts. The length of the canoeing and rowing venue in Jakabaring Lake was extended to 2,300 meters, while new rowing facilities and a tribune were built on the lake shore. Other existing venues which was used for Games were also renovated, including Ranau Sports Hall as sepak takraw venue.

Athletes' villages 
A 10-hectare athletes' village was constructed in Jakarta's Kemayoran district, with 7,424 apartments in 10 towers, and a total capacity of 22,272. A second athletes' village was built at Jakabaring Sports City at Palembang, which housed 3,000 athletes and officials.

Transport 

As part of the Games preparation, the construction of the Jakarta MRT and Jakarta LRT was accelerated, though neither were ready for general commercial operation at the time of the opening ceremonies. A line of Jakarta LRT connected the athletes' village at Kemayoran in Central Jakarta to the Velodrome at Rawamangun in East Jakarta. City bus operator TransJakarta added 416 buses to serve the officials, and also provide free rides on selected days during the Games.

Palembang upgraded their transportation facilities ahead for the Games by building 25 kilometres of the Palembang Light Rail Transit from Sultan Mahmud Badaruddin II International Airport to Jakabaring Sports City which opened for public use in July 2018. Sultan Mahmud Badaruddin II International Airport is expanding its existing arrival and departure terminals to increase its capacity and also connecting the airport with the light rail transit (LRT) terminal by building a skybridge. Other transportation facilities such as toll roads, flyovers, and bridges will be also built in and around the city.

The Games

Opening ceremony

The opening ceremony started at 19:00 Western Indonesian Time (UTC+7) on Saturday, 18 August 2018. Wishnutama, then-CEO of Indonesian TV network NET. was the creative director for the ceremony. The ceremony stage showcased a towering 26 meter-high mountain with a waterfall as its background, accompanied by Indonesian plants and flowers. North and South Korea delegates marched together under one unified flag of Korea, which marked the first time both countries did so in the Asian Games after 12 years.

The games was officially opened by the President of Indonesia, Joko Widodo.

Sports 

In March 2017, the Olympic Council of Asia initially announced that the Games would feature 484 events in 42 sports, including the 28 permanent Olympic sports contested at the 2016 Summer Olympics, the five additional sports that will be contested at the 2020 Summer Olympics in Tokyo, as well as events in other non-Olympic sports. In April 2017, the OCA approved reductions in the programme in response to cost concerns; belt wrestling, cricket, kurash, skateboarding, sambo, and surfing were dropped from the programme, and there was to be a reduced number of competitions in bridge, jet ski, jujitsu, paragliding, sport climbing, taekwondo (in particular, all non-Olympic weight classes), and wushu. These changes reduced the total number of events to 431.

The final programme was unveiled in September 2017, increasing it to 462 events in 40 sports (61 disciplines) as the second-largest programme in Asian Games history. Additional disciplines being introduced at the 2020 Summer Olympics were also added, including 3x3 basketball and BMX freestyle.

For the first time in Asian Games history, esports and canoe polo were contested as demonstration sports in the Games. Six video game titles, most notably Pro Evolution Soccer 2018, were featured in the esports events.

Participating National Olympic Committees 
All 45 members of the Olympic Council of Asia participated in the games. North Korea and South Korea competed as a unified team in some events under the name "Korea" (COR), and marched together under the Korean Unification Flag during the opening and closing ceremonies. With a gold medal in the Women's 500 metre dragon boat competition, a unified team won their first-ever gold medal in a multi-sport event.

Originally set to compete as Independent Asian Athletes, the Kuwaitis were allowed to compete under their own flags just two days before the opening ceremony.

Below is a list of all the participating NOCs. The number of competitors per delegation is indicated in brackets.

Number of athletes by National Olympic Committees (by highest to lowest)

Calendar 
All times are in Western Indonesia Time (UTC+7)

Closing ceremony

The closing ceremony started at 19:00 Western Indonesia Time (UTC+7) on Sunday, 2 September 2018 and ended at 21:25. In addition to local artists and a Chinese segment, the South Korean boybands Super Junior and iKon, and Indian singer Sidharth Slathia performed in the ceremony. Mayor of Hangzhou Xu Liyi received the Games flag for the 2022 Games from Jakarta Governor Anies Baswedan and South Sumatra Governor Alex Noerdin.

Medal table 

China led the medal table for the tenth consecutive time. Korea claimed their first gold medal at the Games in the canoeing women's traditional boat race 500 m event. A total of 37 NOCs won at least one medal, 29 NOCs won at least one gold medal and 9 NOCs failed to win any medal at the Games.

The top ten ranked NOCs at these Games are listed below.

Broadcasting 
International Games Broadcast Services (IGBS), a joint venture between Host Broadcast Services (HBS) and IMG Media was appointed by the organiser in July 2017 to serve as the host broadcaster for these Games. Involving 37 live production units, it distributed 2,400 hours of the Games content to its international rights holders. The International Broadcast Centre was constructed in Jakarta Convention Center, with a smaller one constructed at the Palembang cluster.

Concerns and controversies 

Before the Games, authorities in Indonesia were confident both host cities would be ready for the Games although they have had only four years to prepare rather than the usual six after stepping in to fill the gap when Vietnam, whose city of Hanoi was originally chosen to host these Games by the Olympic Council of Asia, dropped out in 2014 citing concerns over costs. On top of that, work in both host cities was delayed throughout 2015 because government funding was not immediately available.

Various concerns from traffic congestion problems, series of terror attacks, which local police claimed is a pre-Asian Games crackdown on terror suspects and petty street criminals, and already-provoked Indonesian fans at the venue.

Jakarta struggled with air pollution and river pollution problems. River pollution revealed where authorities covered a foul-smelling river near the athletes' village with black nylon mesh over fears it will be an eyesore at the showpiece event. Governor of Jakarta at that time, and the Indonesian Environment and Forestry Ministry quickly relieved the issues by various solutions.

A doping case from a Turkmen wrestler was recorded, which jeopardize the sport's existence for future Games.

See also 

1962 Asian Games
2018 Asian Para Games
2018 Winter Olympics

Notes

References

External links 

 (archived)
Jakarta and Palembang 2018 at Olympic Council of Asia

2018 Asian Games
Asian Games by year
Asian Games
Asian Games
Asian Games
Sport in Jakarta
Sport in South Sumatra
Multi-sport events in Indonesia
2010s in Jakarta
International sports competitions hosted by Indonesia
Asian Games
Asian Games
2018 establishments in Indonesia
Asian Games in Indonesia